The Black Caucus of the American Library Association (BCALA) is an affiliate of the American Library Association (ALA) that focuses on the needs of African American library professionals by promoting careers in librarianship, funding literacy initiatives, and providing scholarships.

History
While work began to organize a Black Caucus of the American Library Association in 1968, this work increased in 1969 when E. J. Josey was appointed to the American Library Association Nominating Committee.  For the 1970 Midwinter meeting, black librarians were encouraged to find socially responsible candidates, African American and Caucasian American, for the 1971 council.  During the 1970 Midwinter meeting, a Black Caucus was formed to meet the unmet needs of the African American library professionals with Josey as the chairman.

The Black Caucus was not officially affiliated with the ALA until 1992; the first National Conference of African American Librarians (NCAAL) was also held in 1992.

As an advocacy and solidarity organization, BCALA campaigned to save the library studies program at Clark Atlanta University, a historically black university which had educated the majority of African American librarians until its closing. Following the 2010 Haiti earthquake, the BCALA Haitian Relief Fund was created to support relief efforts through the Save the Children Fund and the American Red Cross. In 2015, BCALA planted a tree in Ferguson, Missouri, in honor of Michael Brown.

In 2006, BCALA took part in the first Joint Conference of Librarians of Color, along with the American Indian Library Association, the Asian Pacific American Librarians Association, the Chinese American Librarians Association, and REFORMA. This conference was the first national conference sponsored and held by those organizations, which are known as the Associations of Ethnic Librarians.

The Joint Council of Librarians of Color (JCLC, Inc.) was founded in June 2015 as an organization “that advocates for and addresses the common needs of the American Library Association ethnic affiliates“; these ethnic affiliates include BCALA, as well as the American Indian Library Association, the Asian Pacific American Librarians Association, the Chinese American Librarians Association, and REFORMA: The National Association to Promote Library & Information Services to Latinos and the Spanish Speaking.

Goals 
Mission Statement (revised 1995)

BCALA Mission: The Black Caucus of the American Library Association serves as an advocate for the development, promotion, and improvement of library services and resources to the nation's African American community; and provides leadership for the recruitment and professional development of African American librarians.

Membership
Fees/levels are: 
 Student $10
 Library Support Staff $20
 Retired $25
 Regular $45
 Institutional/Institutions $60
 Corporate $200
 Lifetime $500

Awards 
The BCALA offers awards for books, e-books, innovative leaders (referred to as trailblazers), and a scholarship in honor of E.J. Josey.

Awards are given for four categories: Fiction, Nonfiction, Poetry Collection, and First Novel.  The initial First Novel award went to Alexs Pate, for the novel Losing Absalom. Some of the recent book awards have been for The Twelve Tribes of Hattie and If One of Us Should Fall. The SELF-e literary award, recognizing self-published poetry and fiction, was created in 2015 by BCALA in partnership with BiblioBoard, becoming the first ebook award sponsored by an organization affiliated with the American Library Association.

The Black Books Galore! contest was sponsored by BCALA to public and school library programs that support increased awareness of African American children's literature through public programming.

Conferences
The National Conference of African American Librarians (NCAAL) has been held nine times since 1992; the first conference was held in Columbus, Ohio, and organized by Sylvia Sprinkle-Hamlin, conference chair. The schedule of 70 programs included a focus on African-American librarians supporting each other professionally as well as highlighting the work of African-American authors and performers. Conferences have continually provided an opportunity for black librarians to network, build community, and address current concerns, such as the need for library subject headings that will allow for easy access to African-American collections.

The August 2015 Conference was held in St. Louis, Missouri. The next National Conference of African American Librarians will be held from August 5–9, in Tulsa, Oklahoma, in 2020.

In 2006, BCALA took part in the first Joint Council of Librarians of Color (JCLC), along with the American Indian Library Association, the Asian Pacific American Librarians Association, the Chinese American Librarians Association, and REFORMA.

Publications
BCALA publications include an Annual Report and Membership Directory and Newsletter.

Governing structure 
The BCALA has a president and works through their various committees.

Past presidents
Most presidents serve two to three consecutive years.

 1970-1971 – E.J. Josey
 1971-1973 – William D. Cunningham
 1973-1974 – James R. Wright
 1974-1976 – Harry Robinson, Jr.
 1976-1978 – Avery Williams
 1978-1980 – Dr. George C. Grant
 1980-1982 – Doreitha R. Madden
 1982-1984 – Robert L. Wright
 1984-1986 – Barbara Williams Jenkins
 1986-1988 – Marva L. DeLoach
 1988-1990 – Edith M. Fisher
 1990-1992 – John C. Tyson
 1992-1994 – D. Alex Boyd
 1994-1996 – Stanton F. Biddle
 1996-1998 – Sylvia Sprinkle-Hamlin
 1998-2000 – Gregory Reese
 2000-2002 – Gladys Smiley Bell
 2002-2004 – Bobby Player
 2004-2006 – Andrew P. Jackson (Sekou Molefi Baako)
 2006-2008 – Wanda Kay Brown
 2008-2010 – Karolyn S. Thompson
 2010-2012 – Jos N. Holman
 2012-2014 – Jerome Offord, Jr.
 2014-2016 – Kelvin A. Watson
 2016-2018 – Denyvetta Davis
 2018-2020 – Richard E. Ashby, Jr.
 2020-2022 – Shauntee Burns-Simpson
 2022-2024 – Nichelle M. Hayes

Committees

 Affiliates
 Awards Committee
 Budget and Finance
 Constitution and Bylaws
 Dr. John C. Tyson (Award Committee)
 Fundraising
 International Relations
 Membership
 Nomination and Election
 Program
 Publications
 Recruitment and Professional Development
 Technology Advisory

See also 
 American Library Association

References

External links

 ALA page on the Black Caucus of the American Library Association
BCALA Newsletter
 ALA Black Caucus Selections at Mid-Continent Public Library
 Poets & Writers Black Caucus of the American Library Association Literary Awards

American Library Association
African-American librarians